Salman Pak, meaning "Salman the Pure", is a city located approximately  south of Baghdad near a peninsula formed by a broad eastward bend of the Tigris River. It is named after Salman the Persian, a companion of the Islamic prophet Muhammad who is believed to be buried in a mosque in this city.

The city overlaps with the ancient metropolis of Al-Mada'in, which includes the ruins of ancient Ctesiphon and ancient Seleucia. It is also quite close to the Salman Pak facility, an Iraqi military installation which was a key center of Saddam Hussein's biological and chemical weapons programs, though none of these were found. The site included training grounds used by Iraqi intelligence to direct Special Operations Forces.

See also
 Middle East
 Mesopotamia

References

Populated places in Baghdad Province